Paravastu Chinnayasuri (1806/7–1861/2) (Telugu: పరవస్తు చిన్నయ సూరి) was a Telugu writer who played a prominent role in the elevation of prose to importance in Telugu literature. He was the first Telugu Pandit at the Presidency College, Madras. He was born in 1806/7 in Perambur of Chengalpattu district and died in 1861/2. Suri was born in a Satani family as the son of Venkata Rangayya, a Vaishnavite scholar. He worked as a Telugu teacher at Pachaiyappa's College in Madras. He also worked as a law scholar for the Supreme Court of East India Company. He was a Pundit in the Sanskrit, Telugu, Prakrit, and Tamil languages. He was acclaimed as a profound scholar in Telugu and Sanskrit in the traditional education. More than a third of his life span was spent in teaching Telugu in schools and in the Presidency college, Madras.

Literary works
Chinnayasuri translated the first two books of the Sanskrit Panchatantra into Telugu, entitling his translation the Nīticaṃdrika. It was published by Vavilla Ramaswamy Sastrulu and Sons in Madras. He wrote the Bālavyākaraṇamu, a textbook for teaching Telugu grammar in schools. He translated Thomas Lumisden Strange's Manual of Hindoo Law of 1856, entitling it the Hiṃdūdharmaśāstrasaṃgrahamu.

References

External links

https://web.archive.org/web/20070310212743/http://www.teluguworld.org/lit.html
http://panchatantra.org/index.html
https://web.archive.org/web/20090410030240/http://www.textbooksonline.tn.nic.in/Books/12/Telugu/Prose/1%20Mithrabedhamu.pdf
https://archive.org/stream/HistoryCultureOfTheAndhras/TXT/00000324.txt

Telugu writers
1807 births
1861 deaths
Academic staff of Presidency College, Chennai
19th-century Indian linguists
Sanskrit–Telugu translators
Grammarians from India